Unity (Moldovan Cyrillic: Унитате;) is an inactive political party in Transnistria. In the 10 December 2000 legislative elections, the party won 9 out of 43 seats.

Election results 

Political parties in Transnistria